The Rajapalayam, also known as the Polygar Hound or Indian Ghost Hound, is a southern Indian dog breed. The breed is named after Rajapalayam, a town in the Virudhunagar, Tamil Nadu.

Four commemorative postage stamps were issued on 9 January 2005 by India Post for four breeds: Himalayan Sheepdog, Rampur Hound, Mudhol Hound (Face value  5 each) and Rajapalayam (Face value  15). The Rajapalayam dog is known to live up to 12 years of age.

History

In the 18th century, there are records of about 50 different dog breeds being recognized in the Indian subcontinent.  One of them was this breed of dog known as Rajapalayam.  Historical observers believe that it was first raised during the Nayak dynasty, the main royal family of Tamil Nadu.  Not only are they great watchdogs but fiercely loyal, they are also very handsome to look at.  It cannot be forgotten that the villagers of the region used them in ancient times to guard the agricultural crops, livestock and agricultural produce and today it has become one of the most popular dog breeds in India. It is recorded in history that during the Poligarh wars of Karnataka and Tipu Sultan from 1799 to 1805, it was used as a royal encampment and played a very important role in the battle by biting and killing horses.  It is also said that Tipu made a large collection of them in his hands.  Today, the Indian army has realized the greatness and ability of these dogs and has trained them in the force.

Appearance
It is a large dog, usually measuring about 65–75 cm (25–30 inches) at the withers and weighs 30 – 45 kg. Mostly found in the centre of Tamil nadu, the Rajapalayam was bred to be the complete hunter and estate guardian with features that allow it to excel.  Primarily used to hunt wild boar independent of the handler, the Rajapalayam is unique in two ways. First, it fulfills the functions of a bay dog as well as a catch dog; secondly the Rajapalayam can hunt by sight as well as track by scent. While hunting they can be relentless pursuers that are not intimidated by complex terrain or bodies of water. After finding their prey, the dogs take it down and bring it back to the handler. If the dog is unable to bring down its prey, it injures and corners the target till the handler can get to it. This dog can hunt alone, in pairs, in a pack, or with its owner. 

Rajapalayams tend to be more muscular and heavier boned than most sighthounds, but they share the deep chest and basic body structure that exudes speed and physical ability. Its facial structure is considerably different from that of a Caravan Hound, with a slightly larger head and more powerful jaws. It has a slightly curled tail. 

An extremely handsome and graceful dog, the Rajapalayam has a double suspension gait, similar to the trotting of a thoroughbred horse. The staple colour is milk white, although faint brown markings are quite common, and the pink nose is standard.

Eye color can range from golden to brown and green. Puppies born with whitish or blue eyes are usually deaf and should not be bred. The coat is single, short, and fine; these dogs don't do well in very cold climates, but excel in the heat of South India or tropics. 

While many Rajapalayam dogs suffer from mange, it rarely is serious, as mange is actually caused by mites, so it is basically a matter of preventing mites rather than a breed issue. Otherwise, the breed is robust and low-maintenance.

Rajapalayam dogs have a pink nose, button ears, whiptail and golden eyes. They have a gait similar to that of a horse and were also used during the Carnatic Wars and Polygar war against the British cavalry. They aren’t fast runners, but are tireless and steady over long distances. There were reports that the Indian Army in Kashmir had them as guard dogs.

Future of the breed
The pure Rajapalayam used to only be found in isolated pockets around southern Tamil Nadu. A dog breeding unit was established at Saidapet, Chennai, during 1980–81. This unit primarily rears native breeds such as the Rajapalayam dog, Combai dog, kanni, and Chippiparai. To create awareness and encourage dog lovers to rear native breeds, the Animal Husbandry Department of the Government of Tamil Nadu participates in dog shows. Localities have established a cooperative, and interested families receive female dogs and the expertise that is required for large-scale breeding. The Indian Postal Department has brought out postage stamps on the Rajapalayam dog breed, as well as the Mudhol Hound, Rampur Hound, and the Himalayan Sheepdog. The Kennel Club of India has taken up the cause of the Rajapalayam.  With the club's cooperation, the "Save the Rajapalayam Project" has been launched. These initiatives have successfully brought the breed back from the brink of extinction.

It is important to research properly before purchasing or adopting a puppy, because many unethical breeders are giving customers inbred and genetically compromised puppies.

See also
 Dogs portal
 List of dog breeds
 List of dog breeds from India
 Pampas Deerhound

References

External links
 https://petidregister.com/rajapalayam/how-long-do-rajapalayam-live-rajapalayam-lifespan/

Dog breeds originating in India
Sighthounds